The 2016 Ulster Senior Hurling Championship was the 68th staging of the Ulster hurling championship since its establishment by the Ulster Council in 1901.

The final is traditionally played on the second Sunday in July. The winners receive the Liam Harvey Cup.

Format

A two-tier format was introduced in 2016.  Antrim no longer receive a bye to the final.

Antrim, Armagh, Derry and Down compete in the top tier in a knock-out format.

A second tier, the Ulster Senior Hurling Shield, was created. Donegal, Fermanagh, Monaghan and Tyrone compete in a knock-out format, with the winner gaining promotion to the top tier for 2017.

The beaten semi-finalists in this year's Senior Championship compete in a relegation play-off with the losing team relegated to the Senior Shield for 2017.

Cavan do not participate.

Ulster Senior Hurling Championship

Bracket

Ulster Championship Semi-Finals

Ulster Championship Final

Relegation play-off

Ulster Senior Hurling Shield

Bracket

Ulster Shield Semi-Finals

Ulster Shield Final

References

Ulster
Hurling
Ulster Senior Hurling Championship